Ocra or OCRA may refer to:

 Ocra (Peru), a farming community near Cusco
 Ovarian Cancer Research Alliance, a not-for-profit organization
 Nanos (plateau), formerly Ocra, an area of Slovenia
 OCR-A, a typeface

See also 

 Okra, a vegetable